Scoparia biplagialis, the double-striped scoparia moth, is a moth in the family Crambidae. It was described by Francis Walker in 1866. It is found in North America, where it has been recorded from Alabama, Alaska, Alberta, British Columbia, California, Colorado, Florida, Georgia, Illinois, Indiana, Kentucky, Maine, Manitoba, Maryland, Massachusetts, Michigan, Minnesota, Montana, New Brunswick, New Hampshire, New Jersey, New York, North Carolina, North Dakota, Nova Scotia, Ohio, Ontario, Oregon, Pennsylvania, Quebec, Tennessee, Virginia, Washington, West Virginia and Wisconsin.

The length of the forewings is 6–8 mm. The ground colour of the adults varies from uniform brownish grey to pale grey or even strongly marked with black transverse patches. Adults are on wing from June to August.

Subspecies
Scoparia biplagialis biplagialis
Scoparia biplagialis afognakalis Munroe, 1972
Scoparia biplagialis bellaeislae Munroe, 1972
Scoparia biplagialis fernaldalis Dyar, 1904
Scoparia biplagialis pacificalis Dyar, 1921

References

Moths described in 1866
Scorparia